Tim Sørensen may refer to:

 Tim Sørensen (handballer) (born 1992), Danish handball player 
 Tim Sørensen (speedway rider) (born 2000), Danish speedway rider